Mikke Leinonen (born 14 January 1992) is a Finnish Nordic combined skier. He was born in Lahti. He competed at the FIS Nordic World Ski Championships 2013 in Val di Fiemme, and at the 2014 Winter Olympics in Sochi.

References

External links 
 

1992 births
Living people
Nordic combined skiers at the 2014 Winter Olympics
Finnish male Nordic combined skiers
Olympic Nordic combined skiers of Finland
Competitors at the 2015 Winter Universiade
Sportspeople from Lahti
20th-century Finnish people
21st-century Finnish people